Lake Ptolemy is a former lake in Sudan. This lake formed during the Holocene in the Darfur region, during a time when the monsoon over Africa was stronger. The existence of the lake is dated between about 9,100–2,400 years before present. The shorelines in some places, insofar as they are recognizable, feature riparian landscapes and reeds. The lake was a freshwater lake replenished by groundwater and runoff from neighbouring mountains and might itself have been the source for the Nubian Sandstone Aquifer System. The lake featured a diverse ecosystem with a number of species, and possibly facilitated the spread of species between the Nile and Lake Chad.

Name and research history 
The lake is also known as "West Nubian lake", "West Nubian Paleolake" and "Northern Darfur Megalake". "Ptolemy lake archipelago" refers to dune fields that were periodically submerged along the eastern shores, forming archipelagos. The lake name was first mentioned in a 1858 map, but its existence became clear only in 1980–1982.

Geomorphology

Context 
During the early and middle Holocene, large lakes such as Lake Chad and Lake Ptolemy developed within the Sahara and river systems such as Wadi Howar flowed, although it is not clear if they were flowing through a still desertic landscape. The formation of these paleolakes was ultimately linked to a stronger African monsoon caused by a higher axial tilt and the perihelion of Earth coinciding with late July and thus the monsoon season. Today the eastern Sahara is among the driest locations on Earth as it is far removed from oceanic moisture sources.

Lake 
Lake Ptolemy is located on the territory of present-day Sudan.

Such a size is comparable to Canada's largest lake, the Great Bear Lake, and larger than Lake Erie. Lower lake stages might have reached  and  elevation, and there is fossil evidence that episodes of shallow water level occurred in the lake. The lake floor in its southern and western sectors reaches  elevation above sea level.

Shorelines developed on Lake Ptolemy's northern margin and the lake submerged two tributary valleys there; the development of dune fields on the western shore makes identification of the shores there difficult and their absence has raised questions about whether the lake actually existed at such large sizes. The shores on the southern and western side developed a riparian zone with vegetation and irregular lakefloor. River deltas formed where wadis entered Lake Ptolemy, and alluvial fans have been identified on the northwestern shores. Chalks formed in Lake Ptolemy generated yardangs, and aragonite, calcite and goethite formed deposits in the adjacent desert, often in swampy areas. Tufa pinnacles formed in the lake, and upon drying playa deposits were left behind.

The lake existed in the area of present-day Wadi Howar in the Darfur Basin. Today the oases of Oyo, Bidi and Nukheila are located on the lake-floor that Lake Ptolemy occupied at maximum highstand. The lake probably resembled present day Lake Chad.

Hydrology 
The lake was nourished by runoff from the Ennedi, Erdi Ma and part of the Kufrah Depression, as well as groundwater; at least one site of the lake floor shows evidence of the release of pressurized water and evidence of higher groundwater levels is widespread in the eastern Sahara.

This runoff reached the lake through various wadis, many of which entered Lake Ptolemy from the north, such as Wadi Fesh-Fesh. The Ennedi was critical for the water balance of lake. To the northwest the Lake Ptolemy drainage system was bordered by areas that drained north, while to the northeast drainage was northeastward. Unlike Lake Chad/Lake Megachad, Lake Ptolemy was not nourished by rivers from the humid and semi-humid tropics, but solely from regional catchments.

The presence of Asphataria indicates that Lake Ptolemy was a freshwater lake especially close to its inflows, although with occasional brackish phases.

At a water level of  Lake Ptolemy would have been connected with a paleodrainage system belonging to the Abyad Plateau. A connection between Lake Ptolemy and Wadi Howar which drains to the Nile is possible. but not proven. At water levels of  Lake Ptolemy would overflow into Wadi Arid.

Biology 
Lake Ptolemy featured a diverse ecosystem, especially in its southwestern sector where tributaries formed river deltas with diverse environments; these include banks, reed beds, shallow lakes and swamps. Plant species documented from Lake Ptolemy include Acacia and Tamarix species, as well as Balanitos aegyptiaca and Capparis decidua. The various water systems aided in the propagation of plants. Reed vegetation formed on the southern and western shores of the lake, and probably extended over its entire perimeter and sometimes into open water. The existence of Typha suggests that shallow lake phases occurred. Microbialites and stromatolites also formed on the lake shores and together with limnites are used to delimit the lake surface.

Ostracods found in the lake include Candonopsis, Cyprideis, Cypridopsis, Cyprilla, Darwinula, Herpetocypris and Limnocytherae. In some places, diatoms were widespread enough to form diatomite deposits.

About 10-18 fish species existed in Lake Ptolemy, such as Clarias lazera, Lates niloticus and Synodontis. Likewise, fossils of land tortoises, water tortoises and hippopotamus were found on the area of the former lake. The existence of marsh animals in the region was already reported in the map of 1858. Further animals documented in fossils include the Nile crocodile and pelomedusidae and trionychidae species. Bees, molluscs and worms were active in the lake sediments, while alcelaphinae, elephants, giraffes, other ungulates as well as other animals such as cane rats lived around the lake.

The south shore of Lake Ptolemy could have been inhabited by neolithic pastoralists. In addition, many human artifacts have been found in the region surrounding the former lake, some of which may have had religious-spiritual significance.

Lake chronology 
The lake basin was probably formed before the Holocene by wind-driven erosion. During the Pleistocene, a "Lake Sidiq" formed in the area of northern Lake Ptolemy. It has been dated at 21,600 ± 600 years before present, while no lake deposits are found dating back to the late Pleistocene; climate at that point was as dry as the present day.

Lake Ptolemy existed as a freshwater lake already around 9,180 ± 185 years before present. A temporary low water level is dated to 7,470 ± 100 and 8,100 ± 80 years before present. This lowstand was associated with strong trophic growth; lowstands in the lake levels allowed land animals to reach the interior of the lake basin. Radiocarbon dating of chalks in a wadi that entered the lake from the north has yielded ages for a highstand of 6,680 ± 135 and 6,810 ± 70 years before present. Other dates from the northern reaches are 7,900 – 6,400 years before present, and 9,250 – 3,800 years before present. Dates obtained from fish fossils in the northern reaches are 2,360 ± 65 and 3,285 ± 70 years before present, during times where lake levels were less stable. No actual drying events are preserved in the fossil data.

Wadis flowing into the lake were transporting water as late as 3,300 – 2,900 and 3,300 – 2,400 years before present on the southern and northern side, respectively. During its drying, the lake split into separate pools. Deflation has removed the youngest deposits, thus the exact time when the lake disappeared is not known. Today wind-driven erosion is the dominant process in the area; the northeasterly trade winds have formed sand deposits including barchans on the southwestern side of the former lake.

Relationship to groundwater and ecosystems 
The lake further aided in the interchange between Lake Chad and Nile species.

See also

References

Bibliography 

Ptolemy
Holocene events
†Ptolemy
Natural history of Sudan